Wild Dogs  is a 1985 Cuban drama film directed by Daniel Díaz Torres in his directorial debut. It was entered into the 14th Moscow International Film Festival.

Cast
 Orlando Casín
 René de la Cruz
 Adolfo Llauradó
 Alejandro Lugo
 Raúl Pomares
 Adria Santana
 Ana Viña
 Salvador Wood

References

External links
 

1985 films
1985 drama films
1980s Spanish-language films
Cuban drama films